BrikWars is a free miniatures wargaming system by Mike Rayhawk, created for use with plastic building blocks and figurines. It is designed to be simple and flexible, allowing for its players' full range of creativity in creating armies, creatures, vehicles, and worlds out of construction toys.

Although targeted primarily at adults, BrikWars is known for its straight-faced acceptance of the kinds of ridiculous scenarios and multi-genre mashups that arise naturally when children dump out their unsorted toybins on the floor.  Much of its humor comes from satirizing "serious" wargames and their players, while flouting or deliberately misinterpreting conventions of the genre.

Play mechanics 
BrikWars uses "minifigs" (usually Lego minifigures or equivalent miniature figures from other construction toy brands) as small soldiers, and terrain constructed from construction bricks or random objects found near the playing area. While the game can be played with non-construction-toy-related objects, such as action figures, stuffed animals, or chessmen, the rules lend themselves best to figures and structures which can be easily disassembled and reconstructed.  These models might represent real or imaginary forces and situations, but are just as likely to represent exactly what they are - toys engaging in arbitrary battles for toy supremacy.

BrikWars is a turn-based skirmish-level miniatures wargame.  Each player in the game controls forces custom-built from construction toys or whatever materials they have at hand. The creations are assigned attributes according to the current size and features of the physical models at any given moment.

Players take turns, with each player moving and attacking with each of their units able to do so, before passing the turn to the next player in sequence. This continues until each player or team has succeeded or failed in their objectives, or until players agree that the battle is over. Normally each unit is able to move once (a number of inches based on its "Move" statistic) and take a single major action (usually to make an attack, or to use one of its special abilities known as a "Specialty") in a given turn, in addition to any number of minor actions. Units have lots of options such as: withholding its action that turn, to be able use that action in response to Enemy action; sprinting; charging; bailing or forming up into a squad.

For determining the success or failure of actions and attacks, each unit is assigned an appropriately sized polyhedral die for its Action attribute, which it must roll against a set number determined by the difficulty of the act.  When an attack successfully hits, the attacker rolls their weapon's Damage dice in the hopes of overcoming the target's Armor stat. Most infantry units are killed by having their Armor overcome once, while larger vehicles and structures are more resilient and may take multiple hits (with their abilities correspondingly degraded) before being destroyed.

The rules also encourage players to disobey the rules as often as possible, as seen in the "Law of Fudge", and for special Hero units who can attempt to ignore the rules completely once per turn with a Heroic Feat. The rulebook repeatedly encourages fun over obsessive rules-lawyering, with an emphasis on making the game as enjoyable as possible for all parties involved.

History 
Legowars, the predecessor of BrikWars, was invented in March 1991 by Eric O'Dell and R. Todd Ogrin. Legowars featured space-themed combat between Lego minifigures, and was distinguished from other miniature wargames of the time by a strong building-brick construction theme allowing the customization of playing pieces.  It was followed in January 1995 by a sequel, Legowars II.

In October 1995, the authors of Legowars received a cease and desist order from the Lego Group for their improper usage of the trademarked word "Lego". As Steve Jackson describes it:

So Ogrin and O'Dell removed their content, but others archived it (adding legal disclaimers). Meanwhile, Mike Rayhawk started work on what would become BrikWars:

 

In February 1997 Rayhawk formally announced BrikWars on rec.toys.lego. BrikWars has been in continual development ever since.

Reception
BrikWars is part of a wider movement of homebrew wargames based on Lego and other children's building block toys, including Evil Stevie's Pirate Game by Steve Jackson. According to The Escapist, BrikWars is a "standout LEGO tabletop effort" in this scene.

Reviewing it on Boardgamegeek, Luke Mason emphasized the economy of "taking all those hundreds of unused LEGOs sitting around and adding stats and rules to them so you can have a real wargame with them."; as well as its "flexible and affordable (if rough in design)" design. He summarizes his views as:

See also
 LUGNET

References

External links
 
 
The BrikWars 2010 rulebook
BrikWars PC Game homepage/download

Miniature wargames
Lego
Wargames introduced in the 1990s